Samiu Kaufusi Vahafolau (born 24 April 1978 in Ovaka, Tonga) is a former rugby union footballer who played for AS Béziers in the French Pro D2 as well as the Tongan national team. His usual position was number eight.

Playing career

Vahafolau was born in Tonga and immigrated with his family to New Zealand in 1991. He made his Super 12 debut for the Blues in 1999, but never fully settled in that competition, spending 5 years alternating between stints with the Blues and Highlanders.

After a stint in Japan with the Sanyo Wild Knights, Vahafolau moved to France in 2007 to join Biarritz Olympique in the Top 14. He would find a home at Biarritz and play some of the finest rugby of his career, scoring 6 tries in 24 matches for the squad in his first season. He was the starting number 8 for Biarritz through the 2009-10 season before falling down the pecking order in 2010-11.

After 4 seasons with Biarritz, Vahafolau dropped down a league to sign with AS Béziers of the Pro D2 for 2011-12.

International Play

Vahafolau made his debut for Tonga in the run-up to the 2007 Rugby World Cup but was not selected to the final squad.

After two years away from the national team, he was brought back in 2011 and scored a try on his return against Fiji on 2 July.

References

External links
Player profile

Tongan rugby union players
People from Vavaʻu
Living people
1978 births
Expatriate rugby union players in France
Tonga international rugby union players
Tongan emigrants to New Zealand
Tongan expatriate rugby union players
Tongan expatriate sportspeople in France
People educated at Onehunga High School
Rugby union number eights